One Hundred Mile House Airport  is a registered aerodrome located adjacent to One Hundred Mile House, British Columbia, Canada.

References

Registered aerodromes in British Columbia
Cariboo Regional District